Tajuria jehana, the plains blue royal, is  a species of lycaenid or blue butterfly found in Asia.

Description

References

Tajuria
Butterflies described in 1883
Butterflies of Asia
Taxa named by Frederic Moore